The Anglo-Burmese Wars were a clash between two expanding empires, the British Empire against the Konbaung Dynasty that became British India‘s most expensive and longest war, costing 5–13 million pounds sterling (£400 million – £1.1 billion as of 2019) and spanning over 60 years. There have been three Burmese Wars or Anglo-Burmese Wars:

 First Anglo-Burmese War (1824 to 1826)
 Second Anglo-Burmese War (1852 to 1853)
 Third Anglo-Burmese War (1885)

Chronology
The expansion of Burma (present-day Myanmar) under the Konbaung dynasty had consequences along its frontiers. As those frontiers moved ever closer to the British East India Company and later British India, there were problems both with refugees and military operations spilling over ill-defined borders.

First Anglo-Burmese War

The First Anglo-Burmese War (1824–1826) ended in a British East India Company victory, and by the Treaty of Yandabo, Burma lost territory previously conquered in Assam, Manipur, and Arakan. The British also took possession of Tenasserim with the intention to use it as a bargaining chip in future negotiations with either Burma or Siam. As the century wore on, the British East India Company began to covet the resources and main part of Burma during an era of great territorial expansion.

Second Anglo-Burmese War

In 1852, Commodore Lambert was dispatched to Burma by Lord Dalhousie over a number of minor issues related to the previous treaty.
The Burmese immediately made concessions including the removal of a governor whom the British had made their casus belli. Lambert eventually provoked a naval confrontation in extremely questionable circumstances and thus started the Second Anglo-Burmese War in 1852, which ended in the British annexation of Pegu province, renamed Lower Burma. The war resulted in a palace revolution in Burma, with King Pagan Min (1846–1853) being replaced by his half brother, Mindon Min (1853–1878).

Third Anglo-Burmese War

King Mindon tried to modernise the Burmese state and economy to ensure its independence, and he established a new capital at Mandalay, which he proceeded to fortify. These efforts would eventually prove unsuccessful, however, when the British claimed that Mindon's son Thibaw Min (ruled 1878–1885) was a tyrant intending to side with the French, that he had lost control of the country, thus allowing for disorder at the frontiers, and that he was reneging on a treaty signed by his father. The British declared war once again in 1885, conquering the remainder of the country in the Third Anglo-Burmese War resulting in total annexation of Burma.

See also
 Burma campaign (World War II)

References

Further reading
 Aung, Htin. The Stricken Peacock: Anglo-Burmese Relations 1752–1948 (Springer Science & Business Media, 2013).
 Bruce, George. The Burma Wars, 1824–1886 (1973).
 Gupta, AshwAni. Military Lessons of Burma (2015).
 Messenger, Charles, ed. Reader's Guide to Military History (2001) pp 73–74.
 Pollak, Oliver B. Empires in Collision: Anglo-Burmese Relations in the Mid-Nineteenth Century (1980)
 Stewart, A.T.Q. Pagoda War: Lord Dufferin and the Fall of the Kingdom of Ava, 1885-186O (1972)
 Tarling, Nicholas, ed. The Cambridge History of Southeast Asia, Vol. 2, Part 1: From c.1800 to the 1930s (2000)  excerpt

Wars involving Myanmar
Burmese
19th-century conflicts
19th century in Burma
19th-century military history of the United Kingdom